Cape Fear is a coastal plain and Tidewater region of North Carolina centered about the city of Wilmington. The region takes its name from the adjacent Cape Fear headland, as does the Cape Fear River which flows through the region and empties into the Atlantic Ocean near the cape. Much of the region's populated areas are found along the Atlantic beaches and the Atlantic Intracoastal Waterway, while the rural areas are dominated by farms and swampland like that of the Green Swamp. The general area can be also identified by the titles "Lower Cape Fear", "Wilmington Metropolitan Area", "Southeastern North Carolina", and "Azalea Coast". The latter name is derived from the North Carolina Azalea Festival held annually in Wilmington. Municipalities in the area belong to the Cape Fear Council of Governments.

The region is home to the Port of Wilmington, the busiest port in North Carolina, operated by the North Carolina State Ports Authority. It is also the location of Military Ocean Terminal Sunny Point, the largest ammunition port in the nation, and the U.S. Army's primary East Coast deep-water port.

Geography
The Cape Fear region is situated on the Atlantic Coastal Plain. A large portion of the region is low-lying wetlands, most notably the Green Swamp, which is one of the rare habitats of the Venus flytrap. The Cape Fear River and the Northeast Cape Fear River are the deeper prominent rivers that flow through the region, with minor rivers like the Lockwood Folly River, Brunswick River, and Shallotte River providing access for small watercraft of small communities.

Counties
Three counties form the core of the Cape Fear region: Brunswick County (since 2009 part of the Myrtle Beach metropolitan area), New Hanover County, and Pender County. As of the 2000 census, the three counties had a combined population of 274,532, at which time all were part of the Wilmington metropolitan area. In 2020 the population of the three counties was 440,353. The coastal communities boast a large, seasonal tourism industry leading to much higher populations in the summer months and lower populations in the winter months.

Two additional counties, Bladen and Columbus, are occasionally included as part of the Cape Fear region, as are Duplin, Onslow, and Sampson counties, but to a lesser extent.

Communities
These are communities found in the metropolitan statistical area.

Cities
Boiling Spring Lakes
Northwest
Southport
Wilmington (principal city)

Towns

Atkinson
Belville
Bolivia
Burgaw
Calabash
Carolina Beach
Carolina Shores
Caswell Beach
Holden Beach
Kure Beach
Leland
Navassa
Oak Island
Ocean Isle Beach
Sandy Creek
Shallotte
St. Helena
St. James
Sunset Beach
Surf City (partial)
Topsail Beach
Varnamtown
Wallace (partial)
Watha
Wrightsville Beach

Former towns
Brunswick Town
Long Beach
Yaupon Beach

Villages
Bald Head Island

Census-designated places

Bayshore
Blue Clay Farms
Castle Hayne
Hampstead
Hightsville
Kings Grant
Kirkland
Masonboro
Murraysville
Myrtle Grove
Northchase
Ogden
Porters Neck
Rocky Point
Sea Breeze
Seagate
Silver Lake
Skippers Corner
Wrightsboro

Unincorporated places

Ash
Charity
Currie
Figure Eight
Montague
Murphey
Piney Grove
Register
Sloop Point
Supply
Winnabow
Yamacraw

Demographics
As of the census of 2000, there were 274,532 people, 114,675 households, and 75,347 families residing within the metropolitan statistical area (MSA). The racial makeup of the MSA was 79.47% White, 17.27% African American, 0.48% Native American, 0.58% Asian, 0.05% Pacific Islander, 1.12% from other races, and 1.02% from two or more races. Hispanic or Latino of any race were 2.45% of the population.

The median income for a household in the MSA was $37,321, and the median income for a family was $44,844. Males had a median income of $32,454 versus $22,998 for females. The per capita income for the MSA was $20,287.

See also
North Carolina statistical areas
Orton Plantation
St. Philip's Church, Brunswick Town
Cape Fear Museum
Cape Fear Regional Jetport (Howie Franklin Field) formerly known as Brunswick County Airport

References

External links
Wilmington Urban Area Metropolitan Planning Organization
Cape Fear Council of Governments
InsiderInfo Guide to Wilmington
InsiderInfo Guide to Southport
InsiderInfo Guide to Topsail

 
Geography of Brunswick County, North Carolina
Geography of New Hanover County, North Carolina
Geography of Pender County, North Carolina
Regions of North Carolina